In the United Kingdom, the medical associate professions are four novel professional groups of mid-level practitioners in the National Health Service who are not qualified in medicine, but who have specific education, training and team frameworks allowing them to deliver some aspects of healthcare that were traditionally restricted to medical doctors. The four roles are:
Advanced critical care practitioner
Anaesthesia associate
Physician associate
Surgical care practitioner

References

Health care occupations
National Health Service